Hellion (Julian Keller) is a fictional character, a mutant appearing in American comic books published by Marvel Comics. He was a member of the student body of the Xavier Institute before its closing and is a member of the X-Men's training squad.

Publication history
Hellion first appeared in New Mutants vol. 2 #2 and was created by Nunzio DeFilippis, Christina Weir, and Keron Grant.

Fictional character biography

New Mutants, vol. 2/Academy X
Born in Los Angeles, California, to parents who managed to work their way out of poverty to become billionaires, Julian was sent to the Xavier Institute in hopes that he would learn to use his powers with some discretion. Hellion has quickly adopted an attitude of superiority while training at the Xavier Institute that has annoyed some of his classmates. A fast favorite of headmistress Emma Frost, who sees in him great potential for heroism as well as a frightening disposition for personal gain and villainy, Julian named himself 'Hellion' in tribute to the former White Queen's first class of students (who had been killed by Trevor Fitzroy).

Hellion has demonstrated quite a significant interest in Sofia Mantega, co-leader of the rival New Mutants squad. The two different personalities had a flirtatious relationship from the beginning, but also often clashed when it came to ideals and beliefs. The two had quite an effect on each other. While Sofia became more rebellious, even helping the Hellions attempt to break Wither out of jail, Julian became more sensitive and more comfortable with his emotions. However, when Sofia rejected Julian's invitation to the school dance, Julian dated all three of the Stepford Cuckoos. By the end of the night, the pair eventually reunited on the dance floor.

Despite his relationship with Sofia, he is particularly hard on her New Mutant teammates like David Alleyne, the New Mutants' other leader, whom he views as possessing a particularly useless mutant power and as a genuine competitor as a leader and strategist. However, when the Blob attacked the school, Julian followed David's plan of attack.

He had an on-and-off friendship with Elixir, initially befriending him until he learned of his past as a Reaver. However, they have since reconciled and have a more friendly and supportive relationship.

Despite his tumultuous relationship with the New Mutants, he was the one who encouraged Sofia to put her squad back together when they were on the brink of disbanding.

Post M-Day
In the aftermath of M-Day, the previous squad system has been abandoned due to the diminished number of powered students. Those left have been placed to join the only squad that would train under the X-Men, called the New X-Men team. Just prior to the competition, Emma asked Julian to make sure that X-23 was eliminated early. However, when given the chance to knock her out, he saved her instead, because he owed her for doing the same during a session in the "Danger Cave". As a result, Emma placed Surge as team leader to punish Julian. Surge and Hellion had a well documented mutual dislike for each other, which only intensified after M-Day. When Sofia overheard Julian saying the depowered David Alleyne no longer belonged at the institute, the also now human Mantega ended her relationship with Keller. She abruptly left the Institute and left Hellion angry and distraught. Julian and Sofia have both been known to dream of each other since Sofia left the school.

Mercury Falling
Julian, having trouble with his powers, is practicing with Beast in the Danger Room when he accidentally blows a hole in the floor. After taking a shower, he goes looking for Mercury when he comes across Loa, Rockslide, and Anole watching the Young Avengers on TV. He eventually finds a bloodied X-23 and finds out Mercury has been kidnapped by the Facility and tags along.
X-23 uses her underworld contacts to find Mercury's captors and Julian is horrified when Laura kills people working for the people who created her and he tells her not to. They head to the Facility and are confronted by Kimura and a squad of guards. After a brief fight, Julian throws Kimura a few miles away and together they find Mercury; when they are confronted by a bunch of Predator Xs, one injures his shoulder.

Quest for Magik
Alongside Nori, Hellion is one of the students who was not transported to Limbo. While he and Surge argue about his reckless disregard for her leadership by leaving with X-23 to save Mercury and not telling her, the other students inside the X-Mansion get transported to Limbo while they are still outside. Trance used her powers to get a message to the two. She told them that they were taken to hell and then she said "Belasco" and disappeared. Surge and Hellion went to the O*N*E. They found out that Amanda Sefton was in a coma in Germany. The two demanded that they be the ones to go see her. Later Hellion, Surge, and a Sentinel are transported to Limbo by Sefton. They are greeted by thousands if not millions of demons. After Illyana comes to her senses, she teleports everyone back to the X-Mansion.

World War Hulk
Hellion is one of the students that goes up against the Hulk when he shows up at the institute. He uses his powers to pin down the Hulk in the first attack but Hulk knocks him away. When Hellion goes in for a second attack he is the first to be defeated. Hulk realizes he is a telekinetic so he gets him out of the way. Hulk smashes his hands together, creating a boom which knocks out Hellion, rupturing his eardrums.

Children of X-Men
While practicing his powers, Julian complains to Mercury about his powers and says he cannot deal with anything smaller than a refrigerator, and because Marvel Girl is still in space, he is one of the last telekinetics on the planet. Afterwards, he and Mercury are with the Stepford Cuckoos trying to locate the youngest mutant on the planet when Emma Frost asks to see them both for an interview. He reminds Emma about her bizarre trust speech and how she has blown them off since the Purifier attack. He says that she is just putting a little distance between them in case they do not make it.

Later, the students all gather to find out who the youngest student is. During the meeting, Nori kisses Julian in front of Prodigy. Julian pushes her off and notices an upset X-23 leave. He flies off outside and Dust catches up to him. He tells her his best friend is dead, the girl he thought he loves is gone, his mentor flipped out, he cannot stop thinking about a girl who literally scares him, and now he has to deal with Nori. He says it is too hard and while he used to be so sure he has no idea now and there is no one to show him. He then thanks Sooraya for being there.
He then walks in on Nori and David in the middle of a fight. He throws David against the ceiling and when he asks Nori if she is OK, David hits him from behind and injures him. He then tells David that he 'didn't kiss her'. to which David replies, 'I know'. He is then told he should go see Elixir about his injuries.

Messiah Complex
While recovering from her injuries, Blindfold predicts that Hellion will be injured. Some of the New X-Men decide to launch a pre-emptive strike against the Purifers. After spying on the Purifers, they are ambushed by the Reavers and Lady Deathstrike, who critically wounds Hellion. Pixie then manages to teleport the team out and are spread between Washington and the institute. He was later seen aboard the X-Jet with Iceman and the New X-Men during the Sentinel attack on the mansion being treated by Mercury. After getting him to what's left of the infirmary, Beast and Prodigy manage to stabilize him.

Later, when Predator X attacks the mansion, Hellion is saved by the New X-Men, and Pixie teleports the other New X-Men to Muir Island.

Divided We Stand
Julian wakes up in a hotel room, still hooked up to medical equipment, after experiencing flashbacks of his injury. He finds Emma Frost watching over him, who soon informs Julian that the X-Men are no more and that the school is gone. Julian immediately panics, claiming Cessily and Sooraya would never have left him, and asks where Laura is, but Emma tells him that everyone is being taken care of. Julian tells Emma that she is taking away everything from him again and Emma puts him to sleep. When Julian awakens again, Emma is gone and he tries to go back home, only to find his parents have put their house up for sale and moved without telling him. Julian begins to search for Magneto, soon finding him and claiming that Magneto needs him.

Magneto refuses, telling him that he knows Julian is extremely hurt by the people he loved, so much so that he wants to hurt them back by joining their "greatest enemy". Magneto leaves Julian, telling him to enjoy his time off because a new war for mutant-kind will come soon enough.

Kidnapping
Julian is later kidnapped along with Boom Boom and Surge by the Leper Queen and her Sapien League. The Leper Queen injects him with a modified version of the Legacy Virus. After X-Force comes to save the mutants, they find out Surge and Hellion have been sent to the United Nations building. Before Wolverine can kill the Leper Queen and save Julian, Nori, and Boom-Boom, X-Force is teleported out by Cyclops. However, after completing their mission X-Force travel back in time and head to the United Nations Building to save Julian and Nori, while X-23 saves Boom Boom. Elixir cures Julian and Nori of the Legacy Virus, saving them.

Utopia
When anti-mutant protesters led by Simon Trask march in San Francisco in support of Proposition X, Julian and a number of other mutants attempt to stall their demonstration. When Hellion taunts the protesters, Trask incites a riot. During the chaos, Julian physically assaults Trask on national television. The event calls Norman Osborn and his Dark Avengers to the city to restore order. In the process, Osborn forms his own team of X-Men led by Hellion's former mentor, Emma Frost, and institutes a curfew on the city. Believing this to be a last stand for mutant rights, Hellion gathers a group at a bar owned by the former X-Villain Avalanche with the intent to break curfew and get arrested on TV in non-violent protest. The group fails to make its intended point as Match torches the surrounding area with his powers, and Hellion is arrested by Emma Frost and her Dark X-Men. They are taken into custody after a battle.

Later he is, along with all the other prisoners, saved when Emma and Namor betray Osborn and is currently residing with the rest of the X-Men on Utopia.

Necrosha
Hellion is seen with Surge and Prodigy, fighting the resurrected Rusty Collins.

Second Coming
Hellion participates in a battle to protect the mutant messiah, Hope, and the remaining mutants on Utopia against Bastion's Nimrod Class Sentinels from the future. During the fight he is overpowered and is injured, losing both of his hands and most of his right forearm. He is placed on life support prior to being shipped to Namor's underwater Atlantean colony for reasons of safety and protection. He is eventually stabilized, but cannot participate in the remaining battle.  After the Nimrod fleet is destroyed and Hope defeats Bastion, Hellion confronts her, bitter about his injuries, but is rebuffed by Magneto.

Fables of the Reconstruction

Following the events of Second Coming, Hellion is with Kavita Rao, testing metal hands created by Madison Jefferies; however, his telekinetic energy apparently interferes with the operation of cyborg hands or even conventional prosthetic hands, since none can be adapted to his use. After destroying her lab, Rogue comes to collect him to help out rebuild in San Francisco. During the reconstruction of a building, Hellion is resentful of Hope Summers, blaming her for his injuries. While taking out his anger on some old walls he starts becoming reckless and almost hits Hope and a young girl helping her. Hope goes to confront Julian when Karima flies towards the trio and begins attacking them.

During the ensuing battle, Hellion's powers manifest uniquely as he is able to feel the telekinetic wave and the objects it touches down to their sub-atomic structures, moving it through the empty space within atoms to hit a target behind them. After momentarily disposing of Hellion when he is distracted by the other X-Men, who think he initiated the attack, Karima defeats the team and begins procedures to kill them off, but Hellion engages her a second time in a short and brutal assault fueled by his repressed rage, crushing her in battle. Her human side briefly reasserts itself during the fight, asking Hellion to put her out of her misery and stop her from harming others. He does so, delivering a telekinetic onslaught that leaves her in a coma and possibly brain dead. During a conversation with Cyclops, Hellion shows no remorse for his actions and is informed he is on probation. If he cannot control himself, he will either have to leave Utopia or be locked up in the Brig.

X-23
In the X-23 series, Hellion and X-23 address their previous closeness more openly since the events of New X-Men, while he defends her from the scorn of her former New X-Men teammates, who are wary of her due to her involvement with X-Force. After a fire breaks out at a half-way house X-23 was sent to, Hellion goes to visit her in the infirmary on Utopia. When he enters her room, he walks in on what appears to be X-23 stabbing Wolverine. In reality however, Logan's soul has been sent to hell and his body is possessed by a demon. The demon started the fire in the half-way house, murdered its occupants, and has been invading X-23's dreams. While X-23 tries to explain, the demon-possessed Wolverine stabs Hellion in the back. To save his life, X-23 bargains with the demon.

Hellion has left Utopia with Wolverine to Westchester to the Jean Grey Academy, which is now being headed by Wolverine.

8 months after the events of Secret Wars, Hellion is shown to be dying of the M-Pox disease after accidentally coming in contact with the Terrigen Mist. He attacks New Attilan in retaliation, but is defeated by Synapse. Hellion is then taken into custody by the Inhumans, with Medusa promising that he will be given medical attention.

Hellion was treated and cured of his M-Pox symptoms at the New Attilan General Hospital. As an act of gratitude, he decided to pay the hospital back with volunteer work.

Powers and abilities
Hellion is an unusually strong telekinetic. He is able to fly at supersonic speeds, create telekinetic force fields, unleash powerful blasts of telekinetic force, and levitate and manipulate objects from afar. His telekinetic aura is colored light green and glows around his hands, body, and the objects he telekinetically moves and controls.

When Emma unlocked subconscious blocks on his mutant ability, Hellion was able to reach a flight speed several times the speed of sound, faster than one of the O*N*E Sentinel pilots believed possible and destroyed a Sentinel by telekinetically hurling an armored wagon through it, but was severely injured from the physical strain afterward. With this lack of focus, Hellion has difficulty using his telekinetic abilities with fine control such as lifting up a paper clip but has no problem in raw power when it comes to destroying the entire floor that the paper clip resides on. During his battle with Bastion, he said he felt his telekinesis get stronger and he can now control matter at a molecular level. This was proven when he sent a telekinetic blast through Hope and into Omega Sentinel without harming Hope, but completely destroying Omega Sentinel.

In contrast to most other possessors of extremely strong and powerful telekinesis, Hellion tends to focus and channel his telekinetic energy almost exclusively through his hands, very rarely projecting it as a free flow output directly from his brain. After losing his hands, Hellion's control over his telekinesis was greatly strengthened and magnified, he used his exceptionally powerful telekinesis to feed himself and his telekinetic aura now emanates from his brain. After the Age of X, Dr. Kavita Rao observes that Julian has actually benefited from the experience. She notes that the perception of living a lifetime in that world has allowed Hellion to refine his much stronger telekinetic abilities to fully control and manipulate the artificial hands created for him, a feat that normally could not be accomplished in Julian's condition before the Age of X reality.

Other versions

House of M
Hellion was a Junior S.H.I.E.L.D. operative, part of Dani Moonstar's Hellions squad, and was operating under the codename Scion (the name Hellion was chosen to impress Emma Frost. In this reality, Emma was never his adviser. It is unknown why he chose the name Scion in this reality). He was involved with a fellow-Hellion known as Wind Dancer in this reality.

Age of X
Hellion is a member of the Force Warriors, a select group of telekinetics who rebuild the "Force Walls" (telekinetic shields that protect Fortress X) on a daily basis. His fellow Xman Bling! has a fangirl crush on him. Prior to arriving at Fortress X, Hellion was on the run before being attacked by soldiers. During the attack, a laser intended to kill him instantly succeeded in severing his hands and forearms. To replace his lost hands, Hellion utilizes a pair of metal hands that he manipulates with his telekinesis.

Old Woman Laura
In a possible future, Julian and Laura, who had become the new Wolverine, reestablished their relationship. However, after several years together, he is killed during a superhuman conflict known as the Doom World War.

In other media
Hellion appears in Wolverine and the X-Men, voiced by Roger Craig Smith. This version is a member of Professor X's future X-Men.

In popular culture
 Hellion and his relationship with X-23 is referenced in the MC chris song "Nrrrd Grrrl": "X-23 and Hellion, odd couple, to be kind"

References

External links
 

Fictional characters from Los Angeles
Male characters in comics
Marvel Comics characters who have mental powers
Marvel Comics mutants
Marvel Comics superheroes
Comics characters introduced in 2003
Marvel Comics telekinetics
X-23
Characters created by Nunzio DeFilippis
Characters created by Christina Weir